Amir Jafari (born December 22, 1985, in Tehran) is an Iranian Paralympic powerlifter who won a silver medal at the 2020 Summer Paralympics in 65 kg event. A few months later, he won the silver medal in his event at the 2021 World Para Powerlifting Championships held in Tbilisi, Georgia.

Major results

References

External links 
 

1985 births
Living people
Sportspeople from Tehran
Paralympic powerlifters of Iran
Medalists at the 2020 Summer Paralympics
Powerlifters at the 2020 Summer Paralympics
Paralympic silver medalists for Iran
Paralympic medalists in powerlifting
21st-century Iranian people